Micropentila fontainei is a butterfly in the family Lycaenidae. It is found in the Democratic Republic of the Congo (Équateur and Sankuru) and Uganda (from the west to the Bwamba Valley). The habitat consists of primary forests.

References

Butterflies described in 1965
Poritiinae